The four operas of Richard Wagner's cycle Der Ring des Nibelungen together take about 15 hours, which makes for several records, tapes, or CDs, and much studio time. For this reason, many full Ring recordings are the result of "unofficial" recording of live performances, particularly from the Bayreuth Festival where new productions are often broadcast by German radio. Live recordings, especially those in monaural, may have very variable sound but often preserve the excitement of a performance better than a studio recording.

Recordings
The following lists some well-known recordings of the complete Ring Cycle:

The recording conducted by Georg Solti was the first stereo studio recording of the complete cycle. In a poll on the BBC Radio 3's long-running radio programme CD Review, this set was voted as the greatest recording of the 20th century. Although Solti's was the first studio stereo recording, the cycle had previously been recorded live in stereo by Decca engineers at the Bayreuth Festival in 1955 under the baton of Joseph Keilberth. Although unavailable for over 50 years, this cycle was finally released in 2006 on CD and vinyl by Testament.

Gramophone, for example, lists the Solti recording as its recommendation on its website. However, when their long-time Wagner critic Alan Blyth reviewed recordings of the Ring for the feature "Building a Library" on the BBC's CD Review (then Stereo Review) in 1986, he favoured the Böhm and Furtwängler/RAI recordings. When John Deathridge carried out a follow-up review for the programme in 1992, he favoured parts of the Goodall, Haitink and Boulez cycles for individual operas and Levine overall.

The Ring Cycle is also available in a number of video or DVD presentations. These include:
 Pierre Boulez conducting the Bayreuth Festival Orchestra, stage director: Patrice Chéreau, 1980–1981. [Philips/Deutsche Grammophon]
 James Levine conducting the Metropolitan Opera Orchestra, stage director: Otto Schenk, 1990. [Deutsche Grammophon 073 043-9] (part of PBS' The Metropolitan Opera Presents.
 Daniel Barenboim conducting the Bayreuth Festival Orchestra, stage director: Harry Kupfer, 1991–1992 [Warner Classics]
 Bertrand de Billy conducting the Orchestra of the Gran Teatre del Liceu, stage director: Harry Kupfer, 2003–2004 [BBC Opus Arte]
 Lothar Zagrosek conducting the Staatsoper Stuttgart, stage directors: Joachim Schlömer (Rheingold), Christof Nel (Walküre), Jossi Wieler (Siegfried) and Peter Konwitschny (Götterdämmerung), 2004 [Tdk]
 Hartmut Haenchen conducting the Netherlands Philharmonic Orchestra, stage director: Pierre Audi, 2006 [Opus Arte]
 Michael Schønwandt conducting the Royal Danish Orchestra, stage director: Kasper Holten, 2006 [Decca 074 3264]
 Zubin Mehta conducting the Orquestra de la Comunitat Valenciana, stage director:  Carlus Padrissa, 2007–2009 [C Major]
 James Levine and Fabio Luisi conducting the Metropolitan Opera Orchestra, 2011, stage director: Robert Lepage [Deutsche Grammophon 0440 073 4770 6]

The Boulez, Barenboim, Zagrosek, and Haenchen performances are also available as audio recordings.

See also
 Das Rheingold discography
 Die Walküre discography
 Siegfried discography
 Götterdämmerung discography

References

Opera discographies
Der Ring des Nibelungen
Operas by Richard Wagner